Jan Grzebski (1942 – 12 December 2008) was a Polish railroad worker who fell into a coma in 1988 and woke up in 2007. He actually stayed in coma for four years but fully recovered only 19 years after.

Biography
Although widely reported as a delayed effect of being hit in the head by a train's hinged car side, the coma was actually the result of a 5-centimeter brain tumor. Over time, Grzebski's aging caused the tumor to shrink enough to relieve pressure on his brain stem, and he eventually and gradually regained full consciousness. Grzebski began to wake from his coma in 1992. Doctors had not expected Grzebski to survive, let alone emerge from the coma. He credited his survival to his wife, Gertruda Grzebska, who cared and prayed for him. Grzebski was a father of four at the time of the accident. While disabled he gained eleven grandchildren. In an interview on 1 June 2007, with the Polish news channel TVN 24, Grzebski described his recollections of the communist system's economic collapse. "When my family spoke to me, I could actually hear them but I could not talk back. I could not send them a signal to tell them that I was still alive." Grzebski died in 2008 from the brain tumor. Jan Grzebski had lived in an invalid state for 19 years of his 66-year life.

Legacy
He was featured in the Ripley's Believe It or Not! comic strip for 27 August 2007.

See also
 List of people who awoke from a coma
 Good Bye Lenin!, a 2003 German film featuring a similar case.

References 

 Cud, obudził się po 19 latach śpiączki Radio Zet
 Pole wakes up from 19-year coma BBC News

1942 births
2008 deaths
Polish people in rail transport
People who awoke from permanent coma like states